Artisanal cheese refers to cheeses produced by hand using the traditional craftsmanship of skilled cheesemakers. As a result, the cheeses are often more complex in taste and variety. Many are aged and ripened to achieve certain aesthetics. This contrasts with the more mild flavors of mass-produced cheeses produced in large-scale operations, often shipped and sold right away.

Part of the artisanal cheese-making process is the aging and ripening of the cheeses to develop flavor and textural characteristics. One type of artisanal cheese is known as farmstead cheese, made traditionally with milk from the producer's own herds of cows, sheep, and goats. Artisan cheeses may be made by mixing milk from multiple farms, whereas the more strict definition of farmstead cheese (or farmhouse cheese) requires that milk come only from one farm.

Definition
There has been a lot of discussion relating to what truly defines artisanal cheese.  According to the American Cheese Society, “The word ‘artisan’ or ‘artisanal’ implies that a cheese is produced primarily by hand, in small batches, with particular attention paid to the tradition of the cheesemaker's art and thus using as little mechanization as possible in production of the cheese.  Artisan, or artisanal, cheese may be made from all types of milk and may include various flavorings.”  While it is something that is debated by some, those involved in the industry still share a passion for making hand-created products, which may or may not include some manufacturing equipment, that will be enjoyed by many consumers.

Process
The artisanal cheesemaking process can be quite extensive and resembles modern chemistry in many aspects.  Many different factors affect a finished artisanal cheese product; these include, but are not limited to, what species of grass is consumed by the cattle that provided the milk source, any sudden changes of heat, and any loss of cultivated yeast, or changes in barometric pressure.  These factors to an extent are different from large commercial cheesemakers, and affect artisanal cheese more heavily.

Popularity
In the last decade, the American artisanal cheese industry has seen an increase larger than that in the twenty years prior, in artisan creameries being licensed for commercial business.  This translates to approximately 450 different artisan cheese makers existing in the United States today.  Three regions have come to lead the way in this category, New England, Wisconsin, and California.  This rise in the popularity of artisan cheesemaking has also coincided with a rise in the number of dairy farms, while traditional cattle ranching has been decreasing in numbers.

Legal concerns
In January 2014, Monica Metz, Branch Chief of the Food and Drug Administration's Center for Food Safety and Applied Nutrition's Dairy and Egg Branch, responded to a New York State Department of Agriculture request asking the FDA to clarify if using wooden surfaces to age cheese was acceptable.  In her response, Metz said the use of wooden surfaces to ripen cheese does not conform to the Current Good Manufacturing Practices.  Metz cited 21 CFR 110.40(a), to support her stance on the issue.
This statement caused concern among those involved in the artisanal cheesemaking process, and consumers who enjoy such cheeses.  It was feared this direction as stated by the FDA would harm local American cheesemakers, but also affect cheeses that follow the same practices that are imported from other nations.  Many groups including the American Cheese Society, a nonprofit trade association which promotes and supports American cheeses, created a letter on June 10, 2014, arguing against the FDA stance on using wooden surfaces to ripen cheese.  The American Cheese Society stressed their stance on strict safety standards during the American cheesemaking process.  Additionally, they commented on how such a ruling would affect the non-manufactured cheese industry, affecting the U.S. consumer's ability to access a multitude of different cheeses, including those created locally or abroad.
On June 11, 2014, the FDA sent an update regarding their earlier stance on the issue.  In the update, the FDA stressed that they are not requiring the prohibiting or banning of wooden surfaces in the cheesemaking process.  Furthermore, they stated there is no Food Safety Modernization Act that specifically mentions the use of wooden surfaces needed in the cheesemaking process.  The FDA advised they would reach out to and engage the artisanal cheesemaking community, in coming together to resolve the issue.

See also

 List of cheeses
 List of cheesemakers
 Artisanal food
 Specialty foods

References

External links
 American Cheese Society
 California's Artisan Cheese Festival
 California Artisan Cheese Guild
 Ancil, Brandon. "Eat the rind, don't sweat the sweat – an artisan cheese primer." CNN.

Cheese